Christopher Ryan Marve (born March 1, 1989) is an American football coach and former player. He is the defensive coordinator and Inside Linebackers coach at Virginia Tech. He formerly was the linebackers coach at Florida State and at Vanderbilt. At Virginia Tech, Marve replaced Justin Hamilton.

High school career
Attending White Station High School in Memphis, Tennessee, Marve was two-year team captain and team MVP. He was voted Tennessee 5A Mr. Football Lineman of the Year in 2007, the first recipient ever from White Station. He helped the Spartans to 12-2 overall record in 2006 and 5A state semifinals, recording 178 total tackles, including 133 solo stops, four QB sacks and eight forced fumbles as a senior.

Considered only a two-star recruit by Rivals.com, Marve was not ranked among the nation's top linebacker prospects. He committed to Vanderbilt, the only scholarship offer he received, on June 7, 2006.

College career
After redshirting his first year at Vanderbilt, Marve started as a redshirt freshman and registered a team-best 51 solo stops, 6.5 tackles for loss, and three quarterback sacks. He was named to College Football News′ All-Freshman first team, as well as Rivals.com′s 2008 Freshman All-America team. Marve also was a member of the Nu Rho chapter of Kappa Alpha Psi fraternity at Vanderbilt.

References

External links
Vanderbilt Commodores bio

1989 births
Living people
Players of American football from Fort Worth, Texas
American football linebackers
Vanderbilt Commodores football players
Coaches of American football from Texas
Vanderbilt Commodores football coaches
Mississippi State Bulldogs football coaches
Florida State Seminoles football coaches
Virginia Tech Hokies football coaches